These are the Spain national football team all-time results:

Spain national football team head to head

Results

Key

1920–1939

57 matches played:

1940–1959

63 matches played:

1960–1979

119 matches played:

1980–1989

103 matches played:

1990–1999

98 matches played:

2000–2009

130 matches played:

2010–2019

133 matches played:

2020–present

39 matches played: (as of 6 December 2022)

Competitive record

FIFA World Cup
 Champions   Runners-up   Third place   Fourth place   Worst result

UEFA European Championship

*Denotes draws including knockout matches decided via penalty shoot-out.**Gold background colour indicates that the tournament was won.***Red border colour indicates that the tournament was held on home soil.FIFA Confederations Cup

Summer Olympics*Denotes draws including knockout matches decided via penalty shoot-out.**Since 1968, Spain has sent its under-23 national team.Venues in SpainUpdated to 30 March 2022See also
 Spain national football team head to head
 Spain national football team records

Notes

References

External links
Spain national results in chronological order, and head-to-head record against all countries – RSSSF
Spain national team matches from 1920 to 1999, with details – European Football
Todos los partidos (all the games) at Selección Española de Fútbol'' (official site) 

 
Results